Tandzaver is a village in the Kapan Municipality of the Syunik Province in Armenia.

Demographics 
The Statistical Committee of Armenia reported its population was 212 in 2010, down from 263 at the 2001 census.

Gallery

References 

Populated places in Syunik Province